Clawson is a surname. Notable people with the surname include:

Adam Clawson (1972–2017), American slalom canoeist
Augusta Clawson (1903–1997), American author of Shipyard Diary of a Woman Welder
Cynthia Clawson (born 1948), American gospel singer
Dave Clawson (born 1967), American football player and coach
John Clawson (1944–2018), American basketball player
John T. Clawson (1945–2011), American politician
John Willard Clawson (1858–1936), American Artist 
Ken W. Clawson (1936–1999), American journalist and spokesman for U.S. President Richard Nixon
L.D. Clawson (1885–1937), American cinematographer
Patrick Clawson (born 1951), American economist
Rudger Clawson (1857–1943), American LDS Church official
Rodney Clawson, American country music songwriter
Terry Clawson (1940–2013), English rugby league player
Tim Clawson (born 1960), American film and television producer, film studio executive and screenwriter